The Institute of Clinical Acupuncture and Oriental Medicine (ICAOM), located in Honolulu, Hawaii, United States, offers master's and postgraduate doctoral degrees in acupuncture and Oriental medicine. ICAOM's programs are accredited by the Accreditation Commission for Acupuncture and Oriental Medicine, and approved by the Hawaii State Board of Acupuncture.

The school is also a member of the National Network of Libraries of Medicine and the Council of Colleges of Acupuncture and Oriental Medicine, while licensed by the State of Hawaii Department of Commerce and Consumer Affairs and the State of Hawaii Department of Education.

The teaching clinic at ICAOM provides instruction to students and medical care to the local population using the modalities of acupuncture, herbal medicine, tui na, cupping, moxibustion and lifestyle counseling.

References

External links
Council of Colleges of Acupuncture and Oriental Medicine

Acupuncture organizations
Traditional Chinese medicine
Education in Honolulu
Educational institutions established in 1996
Alternative medicine organizations
1996 establishments in Hawaii
Private universities and colleges in Hawaii